Eli Ilan (1928 – 1982) was an Israeli sculptor.

Ilan was born in Winnipeg, Manitoba. He enrolled in a premedical curriculum at the University of British Columbia in Vancouver and emigrated to Israel in 1948.  He then studied pre-historic archaeology and physical anthropology at the Hebrew University of Jerusalem.  In 1956, he returned to Canada to study sculpture at the Ontario College of Art & Design.  He lived in Kibbutz Sasa from 1959 to 1963.  He died in 1982 in Caesarea, Israel.

References

Sources
 Dagon, Yoav, Eli Ilan 1928-1982, Retrospective, Herzliya, Israel, Herzliya Museum of Contemporary Art, 1992.
 Kohansky, Mendel, Sculptures of Eli Ilan, London, Jacques O'Hana Gallery, 1974.
 Renee Darom Galerie D'art, Eli Ilan Sculpture, Tel Aviv, Renee Darom Galerie D'art, 1974

External links

1928 births
1982 deaths
20th-century Israeli sculptors
Artists from Winnipeg
Canadian emigrants to Israel
20th-century Israeli Jews
Jewish sculptors
Modern sculptors